Nina Buchmann is a German ecologist known for her research on the physiology of plants and the impact of plants on biogeochemical cycling. She is a member of the German National Academy of Sciences Leopoldina and an elected fellow of the American Geophysical Union.

Education and career 
Buchmann has an undergraduate degree from the University of Bayreuth (1989). Following this, she spent three years at the University of Utah working with James Ehleringer. In 1996 she returned to the University of Bayreuth and finished her habilitation working on the exchange of carbon dioxide between soils and the atmosphere. Starting in 1993, she worked at the Max Planck Institute for Biogeochemistry until she moved to ETH Zurich in 2003 where she is a full professor.

In 2018, she was elected a fellow of the American Geophysical Union who cited "her pioneering work to understand ecophysiological mechanisms regulating ecosystem carbon dynamics locally, regionally and across diverse ecosystems".

Research 
Buchmann's research centers on the role of plants in biogeochemical cycling. Some examples of her research include investigations into the ecophysiology of plants and ecosystems, the flux of carbon and water in terrestrial ecosystems, and biogeochemical processes such as the carbon dynamics of the Amazonian rainforest. Buchmann's early research tracked inorganic nitrogen uptake by trees using stable isotopes, and examined the carbon isotopic signature of C-4 grasses and forests, and soils.

Selected publications

Awards
Founding member of the Junge Akademie (Young Academy of Sciences) (2000–2005)
Member of the German National Academy of Sciences Leopoldina (2007)
Fellow, American Geophysical Union (2018)

References 

Fellows of the American Geophysical Union
Members of the German Academy of Sciences Leopoldina
University of Bayreuth alumni
Academic staff of ETH Zurich
Plant ecologists
Biogeochemists
Women ecologists
1965 births
Living people